Hemibagrus bongan is a species of bagrid catfish found in Asia.

References

Ng, P.K.L. and H.N. Ng, 1995. Hemibagrus gracilis, a new species of large riverine catfish (Teleostei: Bagridae) from Peninsular Malaysia. Raffles Bull. Zool. 43(1):133-142. 

Bagridae
Fish of Asia
Taxa named by Canna Maria Louise Popta
Fish described in 1904